The following is a list of the 26 municipalities (comuni) of the former Province of Olbia-Tempio, Sardinia, Italy.

List

See also 
List of municipalities of Italy

References 

Olbia-Tempio